Lieutenant General Ajai Kumar Singh AVSM, YSM, SM, VSM is the General Officer-Commanding-in-Chief (GOC-in-C) Southern Command of the Indian Army. He assumed the post from Lieutenant-General Jai Singh Nain.

Career 
A graduate of St Gabriel’s Academy, Roorkee and the National Defence Academy, Singh was commissioned into the 7th battalion of the 11th Gorkha Rifles on 15 December 1984. He is also a graduate of the Defence Services Staff College, Wellington and the National Defence College.

Singh commanded 1/11 Gorkha Rifles as part of a Strike Corps, and subsequently on the Line of Control. He later commanded a brigade in Rann Sector, a Counter Insurgency Force in J&K and XXXIII Corps in the Eastern Sector. He has been an Instructor at Commando School, Belgaum and has held a post in the Military Wing at the Indian Embassy, Nepal.  He has also served as Director, Military Operations Branch, Deputy Director General, Discipline & Vigilance, Additional Director General of Military Operations and Director General of Operations & Logistics branch at the IHQ of MoD (Army).

Personal life
An avid mountaineer, Singh has climbed Mount Rathong (22,005 feet). He is also a keen cyclist and yoga enthusiast.

Dates of rank

References 

Living people
Indian generals
Indian Army officers
Recipients of the Ati Vishisht Seva Medal
Recipients of the Vishisht Seva Medal
 Recipients of the Yudh Seva Medal
Recipients of the Sena Medal
Year of birth missing (living people)
National Defence Academy (India) alumni
Defence Services Staff College alumni